The men's 110 metres hurdles  event at the 1948 Summer Olympic Games took place on 3 and 4 August. Twenty-eight athletes from 18 nations competed. The maximum number of athletes per nation had been set at 3 since the 1930 Olympic Congress. The final was won by American William Porter. Porter's compatriots, Clyde Scott and Craig Dixon took 2nd and 3rd place. It was the third of nine consecutive American victories, and the ninth overall gold medal for the United States in the 110 metres hurdles. It was also the first of four consecutive American podium sweeps, and the fifth overall sweep by the United States in the event.

Summary

With the absence of the best American hurdler Harrison Dillard, who did not qualify to the Olympics in the hurdles but did win gold in his secondary event, the 100 metres, the three Americans William Porter, Clyde Scott and Craig Dixon were headlong over the rest of the field.  From the start to finish they ran almost neck to neck, with the others some five yards behind. In the finish, Porter gained a clear win with Scott beating Dixon by inches for second place.

Background

This was the 11th appearance of the event, which is one of 12 athletics events to have been held at every Summer Olympics. Two finalists from the pre-war 1936 Games returned after the 12-year break: silver medalist (and 1932 bronze medalist) Don Finlay of Great Britain and fourth-place finisher Håkan Lidman of Sweden. The "prohibitive favorite" was Harrison Dillard of the United States—until he fell at the U.S. Olympic trials. The American team was deep, however, and Craig Dixon, William Porter, and Clyde Scott were all expected to medal.

Jamaica, Pakistan, Peru, Puerto Rico, Spain, and Turkey each made their first appearance in the event. The United States made its 11th appearance, the only nation to have competed in the 110 metres hurdles in each Games to that point.

Competition format

The competition used the basic three-round format introduced in 1908. The first round consisted of six heats, with 4 or 5 hurdlers each. The top two hurdlers in each heat advanced to the semifinals. The 12 semifinalists were divided into two semifinals of 6 hurdlers each; the top three hurdlers in each advanced to the 6-man final.

Records

These were the standing world and Olympic records (in seconds) prior to the 1948 Summer Olympics.

William Porter matched the Olympic record in the second semifinal, then broke it in the final to set a new record of 13.9 seconds. The other two medalists each finished equal to the old record time.

Schedule

All times are British Summer Time (UTC+1).

Results

Round 1

The first round was held on 3 August. The two fastest runners from each heat qualified to the semifinals.

Heat 1

Heat 2

Heat 3

Heat 4

Heat 5

Heat 6

Semifinals

The semifinals were held on 4 August. The three fastest runners advanced to the final.

Semifinal 1

Semifinal 2

Final

References

External links
Organising Committee for the XIV Olympiad, The (1948). The Official Report of the Organising Committee for the XIV Olympiad. LA84 Foundation. Retrieved 5 September 2016.

Athletics at the 1948 Summer Olympics
Sprint hurdles at the Olympics
Men's events at the 1948 Summer Olympics